The Atlantic dry forests are a tropical dry forest ecoregion of the Atlantic Forest Biome, located in eastern Brazil.

Setting
The Atlantic dry forests stretch from northern Minas Gerais state across western Bahia state into central Piauí. The Atlantic dry forests generally lie along the upper São Francisco River of Minas Gerais and Bahia, and in the basin of the Gurguéia River in Piauí. A large enclave of Atlantic dry forest lies on the Chapada Diamantina of east-central Bahia.

Flora
The Atlantic dry forests are dense, with deciduous and semi-deciduous trees reaching up to 25 to 30 meters in height. The Barriguda Tree, Cavanillesia arborea, is a dry forest tree species distinguished by its huge, bottle-shaped trunk which reaches up to 1.5 meters in diameter.

Fauna

Conservation and threats

References

External links

Atlantic dry forest photos, including Barriguda Tree (World Wildlife Fund)

Atlantic Forest
Neotropical dry broadleaf forests
Ecoregions of Brazil
Forests of Brazil

.
Geography of Bahia
Geography of Minas Gerais
Geography of Piauí